Brattvåg Church is a parish church of the Church of Norway in Ålesund Municipality in Møre og Romsdal county, Norway. It is located in the village of Brattvåg. It is one of the two churches for the Brattvåg parish which is part of the Nordre Sunnmøre prosti (deanery) in the Diocese of Møre. The modern-looking concrete church was built in a rectangular design in 1977 using plans drawn up by the architect Aksel Fronth. The church seats about 650 people.

History
During the 20th century, the village of Brattvåg grew up as an industrial centre for the old Haram Municipality. The church in Brattvåg was built in 1977 using designs by Aksel Fronth. The church was consecrated in 1977. It is a fairly modern looking building with two large triangular walls with a slit of glass in between, forming a somewhat modern take on a church bell tower. The lower level of the building houses a church hall as well as the main entrance to the building while the upper level houses the main sanctuary.

Media gallery

See also
List of churches in Møre

References

Buildings and structures in Ålesund
Churches in Møre og Romsdal
Concrete churches in Norway
Rectangular churches in Norway
20th-century Church of Norway church buildings
Churches completed in 1977
1977 establishments in Norway